Jasper Thomas Brett (8 August 1895 – 4 February 1917) was an Irish rugby international. He won one cap against Wales in 1914 and is currently the 10th youngest international rugby player for Ireland.

He served during the First World War in the British Army as Second Lieutenant in the 7th Battalion of the Royal Dublin Fusiliers. He suffered from shell shock and committed suicide by gunshot at Dalkey, Dublin, in February 1917, aged 21, two days before he was due to return to the frontline. He was buried at Deans Grange Cemetery.

See also
 List of international rugby union players killed in action during the First World War

References

Jasper Brett at Scrum.com
IRFU Profile

1895 births
1917 suicides
British military personnel who committed suicide
British Army personnel of World War I
Irish rugby union players
Ireland international rugby union players
Monkstown Football Club players
Royal Dublin Fusiliers officers
Suicides by firearm in Ireland
People with post-traumatic stress disorder
1917 deaths
British military personnel killed in World War I
Rugby union wings